Richard Webster (born December 9, 1946) is an author, ghostwriter, mentalist, hypnotist and magician.

Biography 

Richard Webster was born in Auckland, New Zealand.  He was educated at King's School and King's College.  As a child, he wrote and produced a weekly neighbourhood newspaper called The Waiochiel that he sold to his neighbours.  He worked in publishing for several years before starting his career as a writer, entertainer, and speaker. He initially worked as a ghost writer, and wrote a small book on the subject. He is the author of 112 books, mainly on New Age topics. He has also written three novels.

His books have been translated into 29 languages: Bulgarian, Chinese (Simplified), Chinese (Traditional), Croatian, Czech, Danish, Dutch, Estonian, French, German, Greek, Hungarian, Bahasa Indonesia, Italian, Japanese, Korean,  Latvian,  Lithuanian, Polish, Portuguese, Romanian, Russian, Serbian, Slovak, Slovenian,  Spanish, Swedish, Thai and Turkish.

Rainbow News described him as "one of the most successful writers in the country". New Idea magazine wrote that Richard is "probably New Zealand's most successful author".

Webster has appeared on numerous radio and TV programs, including Hard Copy, WMAQ-TV (Chicago), KTLA-TV (Los Angeles), KSTW-TV (Seattle), and Mike and Maty (ABC). In 1996, he was one of the performers on The Great Kiwi Magic Show on TV3.

In 2000 the Richard Webster Popular Fiction Award was established, with the winner receiving a $5,000 prize and publication of their winning entry.

Webster is a past president of the New Zealand Society of Magicians. He received the prestigious Grand Master of Magic Award in February 2013.

Personal 

Richard is married with three children and five grandchildren.

Bibliography

Nonfiction

 Freedom to Read, 1972, HPP Press
 Sun Sign Success, 1982, Brookfield Press
 The Stars and Your Destiny, 1982, Brookfield Press
 How to Read Tea Leaves, 1982, Brookfield Press
 Discovering Numerology, 1983, Brookfield Press
 How to Read Minds, 1986, Brookfield Press
 Secrets of Ghostwriting, 1986, Martin Breese Limited
 How to Develop Your Psychic Power, 1988, Martin Breese Limited
 Good Luck from Beijing, 1990, Martin Breese International
 Revealing Hands, 1994, Llewellyn Publications. Reprinted as The Complete Book of Palmistry, 2001
 Omens, Oghams and Oracles, 1995, Llewellyn Publications
 Talisman Magic, 1995, Llewellyn Publications, Reprinted as Numerology Magic, 1998
 Dowsing for Beginners, 1996, Llewellyn Publications
 Feng Shui for Beginners, 1997, Llewellyn Publications
 Aura Reading for Beginners, 1998, Llewellyn Publications
 Spirit Guides and Angel Guardians, 1998, Llewellyn Publications
 Astral Travel for Beginners, 1998, Llewellyn Publications
 Chinese Numerology, 1998, Llewellyn Publications
 101 Feng Shui Tips for the Home, 1998, Llewellyn Publications
 Feng Shui for the Workplace, 1998, Llewellyn Publications
 Feng Shui for Apartment Living, 1998, Llewellyn Publications
 Feng Shui in the Garden, 1999, Llewellyn Publications
 Feng Shui for Love and Romance, 1999, Llewellyn Publications
 Feng Shui for Success and Happiness, 1999, Llewellyn Publications
 Palm Reading for Beginners, 2000, Llewellyn Publications
 Writing as a Business, 2000, Brookfield Press
 Practical Guide to Past-Life Memories, 2001, Llewellyn Publications
 Soul Mates, 2001, Llewellyn Publications
 Write Your Own Magic, 2001, Llewellyn Publications
 Is Your Pet Psychic?, 2002, Llewellyn Publications
 Pendulum Magic for Beginners, 2002, Llewellyn Publications
 Playing Card Divination for Beginners, 2002, Llewellyn Publications
 How to Write for the New Age Market, 2003, Llewellyn Publications
 Amulets and Talismans for Beginners, 2004, Llewellyn Publications
 Miracles, 2004, Llewellyn Publications
 Candle Magic for Beginners, 2004, Llewellyn Publications
 Communicating with the Archangel Michael for Guidance & Protection, 2004, Llewellyn Publications
 Communicating with the Archangel Raphael for Healing & Creativity, 2005, Llewellyn Publications
 Communicating with the Archangel Gabriel for Inspiration & Reconciliation, 2005, Llewellyn Publications
 Communicating with the Archangel Uriel for Transformation & Tranquility, 2005, Llewellyn Publications
 Creative Visualization for Beginners, 2005, Llewellyn Publications
 Magical Symbols of Love & Romance, 2006, Llewellyn Publications
 Color Magic for Beginners, 2006, Llewellyn Publications
 Praying with Angels, 2007, Llewellyn Publications
 Flower and Tree Magic, 2008, Llewellyn Publications
 The Encyclopedia of Superstitions, 2008, Llewellyn Publications
 Encyclopedia of Angels, 2009, Llewellyn Publications
 Prayer for Beginners, 2009, Llewellyn Publications
 Psychic Protection for Beginners, 2010, Llewellyn Publications
 You Can Read Palms, 2010, Llewellyn Publications
 The Complete Book of Auras, 2010, Llewellyn Publications
 Spirit & Dream Animals, 2011, Llewellyn Publications
 Geomancy for Beginners, 2011, Llewellyn Publications
 Face Reading Quick & Easy, 2012, Llewellyn Publications
 Living in Your Soul's Light, 2012, Llewellyn Publications
 All About Self-Hypnosis, 2012, Llewellyn Publications
 Body Language Quick & Easy, 2014, Llewellyn Publications
 Oracle of the Angels, 2014, Llewellyn Publications
 365 Ways To Attract Good Luck, 2014, Llewellyn Publications
 Mind Reading Quick & Easy, 2015, Llewellyn Publications
 Rituals For Beginners, 2016, Llewellyn Publications
 Legacy : How to Write and Publish Your Life Story, 2016, Brookfield Press
 Angels For Beginners, 2017, Llewellyn Publications
 Llewellyn's Complete Book of Divination, 2017, Llewellyn Publications
 Humour In Action : How To Have More Fun At Work, 2017, Brookfield Press
 How To Use A Crystal : 50 Practical Rituals and Spiritual Activities for Inspiration and Wellbeing, 2018, Llewellyn Publications
 Las Vegas Notes 2019, 2019, Brookfield Press
 The Walkaround Mentalist's Toolbox, 2019, Brookfield Press
 Scryer's Elite, 2019, Brookfield Press
  Potential in the Palm of Your Hand, 2019, Llewellyn Publications
 How To Use A Pendulum : 50 Practical Rituals and Spiritual Activities for Clarity and Guidance, 2020, Llewellyn Publications
 The End : Scryer's Confidants, 2020, Brookfield Press
  The Psychic Reader's Toolbox, 2020, Brookfield Press
 The Secret to Attracting Luck, 2021, Llewellyn Publications
 Scryer's Grey Book, 2021, Brookfield Press
 Scryer's Secrets, 2022, Brookfield Press
 Archangels: How to Invoke & Work with Angelic Messengers, 2022, Llewellyn Publications
 Scryer's Eidolon, 2022, Brookfield Press
 Guardian Angels : How To Contact And Work With Angelic Protectors, 2022, Llewellyn Publications

Fiction

 Seven Secrets to Success, 1997, Llewellyn Publications
 Success Secrets, 2001, Llewellyn Publications
 Enemy Within, 2002, Hazard Press

Magic and mentalism 

Richard has written 37 books for magicians and mentalists, many cited as modern-day classics. He has also marketed several effects and produced CDs and DVDs of his techniques and effects. He has ghostwritten magic books for other performers, and he has written several magic books using different pen names.  His magic effects have been published in many industry magazines including Abracadabra, Alakazam, Genii, The Linking Ring, Magicana, Magick, Magigram, Magic New Zealand, The Magic Circular, Mind Over Magic, New Invocation, Seance, Vanish and Vibrations.

Ghostwriting 

Richard made his living as a ghostwriter for several years and has ghosted 30 books on a wide variety of subjects.

Richard Webster Popular Fiction Book Award 

In 2000 Webster in conjunction with Hazard Press, established the annual Richard Webster Popular Fiction Award competition, which ran for five years.  The winning author each year received $5,000, plus publication of their winning entry by Hazard Press.

Awards 

The Dunninger Memorial Award for Distinguished Professionalism in the Performance of Mentalism. Presented by the Psychic Entertainers Association, June 9, 1990.

Variety Artists Club of New Zealand Scroll of Honour 1994.

Variety Artists Club of New Zealand Top Specialty Act 1997.

Dan Blackwood Memorial Award for Outstanding Contribution to the Art of Mentalism presented by the Psychic Entertainers Association, June 2007.

Lifetime Achievement Award in recognition of a lifetime dedicated to excellence in writing magical literature. Presented by Magic New Zealand, December 2008.

Convention of Visionary Retailers Visionary Awards - Best Divination Book 2012 - Spirit and Dream Animals by Richard Webster, June 2012.

Grand Master of Magic Award presented by the Brotherhood of Auckland Magicians and the magicians of New Zealand, February 2013.

The Annemann Award for Mentalism presented by Stevens Magic Emporium, Kansas, March 2014.

References

External links 
 Richard Webster - International Author
 The Constant Author, New Zealand Herald 2005
 Llewellyn Worldwide - Author Profile
 Richard Webster : Grand Master of Magic Citation : Brotherhood of Auckland Magicians Club

1946 births
Living people
New Zealand male novelists
People educated at King's College, Auckland
20th-century New Zealand novelists
21st-century New Zealand novelists
Mentalists
20th-century New Zealand male writers
21st-century New Zealand male writers